Paul Rudolf Parsifal "Percy" Adlon (born 1 June 1935) is a German director, screenwriter, and producer. He is best known for his film Bagdad Cafe. He is associated with the New German Cinema movement (ca. 1965–1985), and has been noted for his strong female characters and positive portrayals of lesbian relationships.

Early life
Adlon was born in Munich, Germany. He grew up in Ammerland/Starnberger See. He studied art, theater history, and German literature at Munich's Ludwig-Maximilian University; took acting and singing classes; and was a member of the student theater group.

Career
Percy's films are shown and compete regularly at international film festivals, such as the Cannes Film Festival, the Berlin International Film Festival, and others.

He started his professional career as an actor, became interested in radio work, was a narrator and editor of literature series and a presenter and voice-over actor in television for 10 years.

In 1970, he made his first short film for Bavarian television, followed by more than 150 documentary films about art and the human condition. His first one-hour portrait Tomi Ungerer's Landleben started a very successful co-operation with Benigna von Keyserlingk who became Adlon's television producer of documentaries and feature films.

Their first feature film Céleste, drew international attention at Cannes in 1981. Bagdad Cafe (1987) started their co-operation with Dietrich v. Watzdorf (Bayerischer Rundfunk). The story of Jasmin Münchgstettner and the Café owner Brenda was an international hit. Marianne Sägebrecht whom Percy Adlon discovered in 1979 became a cult figure, and he developed songs with Tony, Oscar, and Grammy award nominated Bob Telson on such songs as "Calling You" a classic.

Percy and Eleonore Adlon have won numerous awards, including top honors in Rio de Janeiro for Bagdad Cafe, and in Montreal for Salmonberries, two Césars, the Ernst Lubitsch Award, a Norwegian Amanda Award, the Swedish and the Danish Academy awards, the Prix Humanum, Belgium, prizes in Venice, Chicago, Valladolid, Brussels, Tokyo as well as Bavarian and German Federal Film Awards, among others.

Percy Adlon is the recipient of the Officer's Cross of the Federal Republic of Germany, and a voting member of the Academy of Motion Picture Arts and Sciences.

Personal life
Percy is the great-grandson of Lorenz Adlon, the founder of the Hotel Adlon. Percy was the grandson of Louis Adlon Sr., who had five children with his first wife Tilly. After almost 15 years of marriage, he met a hotel guest, the German-American Hedwig Leythen (1889–1967), called Hedda, at a New Year's Eve party in the Hotel Adlon, left his wife and children, and in 1922 he married her. It was one of the biggest scandals of Berlin in the 1920s. Tilly moved with her daughter Elisabeth, then two, to the south of Germany, while the other children Susanne Adlon-Meyerhöfer (mother of Percy), Lorenz, and twins Carl and Louis (junior) were sent to boarding school and later all four emigrated to America.

Adlon's father was opera tenor Rudolf Laubenthal. He grew up in the Bavarian countryside with his mother Susanne and attributes the strong, often unconventional, women's roles in his films to his being brought up in this manner. His son, Felix, also a film director, is the former husband of American actress Pamela Adlon and the father of her three daughters, including actresses Odessa and Gideon Adlon.

Percy and Eleonore Adlon live in Pacific Palisades, California, US.

 is a half-brother of Percy, 15 years younger and son of Emil Meyerhöfer.

Awards

Adolf Grimme Awards, Germany 1979
 Won, Adolf Grimme Award in Gold Fiction/Entertainment for The Guardian and His Poet (1978).  Shared With: Rolf Illig (lead actor)

Amanda Awards, Norway 1989
 Won, Amanda Best Foreign Feature Film (Årets utenlandske spillefilm) for Bagdad Cafe (1987).

Bavarian Film Awards 1988
 Won, Bavarian Film Award Best Screenplay (Drehbuchpreis) for Bagdad Cafe (1987). Shared With: Eleonore Adlon 1983
 Won, Bavarian Film Award Best Direction (Regiepreis) for Fünf letzte Tage (1982).

Bavarian TV Awards 1997
 Won, Bavarian TV Award Directing for The Glamorous World of the Adlon Hotel (1996).

Brussels International Festival of Fantasy Film (BIFFF) 1994
 Won, Silver Raven for Younger and Younger (1993).

Cannes Film Festival 1989
 Nominated, Palme d'Or for Rosalie Goes Shopping (1989).

Chicago International Film Festival 1984
 Nominated, Gold Hugo Best Feature for The Swing (1983).
 Nominated, Gold Hugo Best Feature for Fünf letzte Tage (1982).
 Nominated, Gold Hugo Best Feature for Céleste (1980).

César Awards, France 1989
 Won, César Best Foreign Film (Meilleur film étranger) for Bagdad Cafe (1987).
 Won, César Best Film of the European Community (Meilleur film de l'Europe communautaire) for Bagdad Cafe (1987).

Ernst Lubitsch Award 1988
 Won, Ernst Lubitsch Award for Bagdad Cafe (1987).

Film Independent Spirit Awards 1989
 Nominated, Independent Spirit Award Best Foreign Film for Bagdad Cafe (1987).

French Syndicate of Cinema Critics 1989
 Won, Critics Award Best Foreign Film for Bagdad Cafe (1987). Tied with The Dead.

Guild of German Art House Cinemas 1989
 Won, Guild Film Award - Gold German Film (Deutscher Film) for Bagdad Cafe (1987).
 Won, Guild Film Award - Silver

German Film (Deutscher Film) for Céleste (1980).

Manhattan Film Festival 2012
 Won, Buzz Award for Céleste (1980).

Medias Central European Film Festival 7+1 2011
 Won, Audience Award Best Picture for Mahler on the Couch (2010).  Shared With: Felix O. Adlon

Montréal World Film Festival 1991
 Won, Grand Prix des Amériques for Salmonberries (1991).

Robert Festival 1989
 Won, Robert Best Foreign Film (Årets udenlandske spillefilm) for Bagdad Cafe (1987).

Tokyo International Film Festival 1993
 Nominated, Tokyo Grand Prix for Younger and Younger (1993).

Valladolid International Film Festival 1985
 Won, Silver Spike for Sugarbaby (1985).

Venice Film Festival 1982
 Won, OCIC Award for Fünf letzte Tage (1982).
 Nominated, Golden Lion for Fünf letzte Tage (1982).

Filmography
  (The Aura in the Distance) (1974, documentary) Director, writer
 Der Vormund und sein Dichter (The Guardian and His Poet) (1978, TV film) Director, Writer (written by), Producer (Adolf Grimme Award in Gold)
 Herr Kischott (1980, TV film) Director
 Céleste  (1980) Director, (Writer Special Jury Award IFF Chicago)
 Fünf letzte Tage (Five Last Days) (1982) Director) (German Federal Film Award, Bavarian Film Award, OCIC-Prize, IFF Venice, 1982)
  (1983) Director, Writer
 Sugarbaby (1985) Director, Writer ... a.k.a. Sugarbaby (Ernst-Lubitsch-Award for Marianne Sägebrecht)
 Herschel und die Musik der Sterne (1986, TV film) Director, Writer
 Out of Rosenheim a.k.a. Bagdad Cafe (USA) (1987) Director, Writer, Producer (Grand Prix IFF Rio de Janeiro, César, best foreign Film (French FIlm Award), Ernst-Lubitsch-Award (Director), Swedish and Danish Film Academies, Bavarian Film Award (original screenplay) Prix Humanum, Belgium.)
 Babycakes (1989, TV film), American remake of Zuckerbaby aka Sugarbaby, co-writer
 Rosalie Goes Shopping (1989) Director, Writer, Producer (Official German Entry, 1989 Cannes Film Festival. Best Film - Section "Cinema & Denaro", IFF EuropaCinema & TV, Viareggio.)
 Red Hot + Blue: A Tribute to Cole Porter (1990, TV film) Director
 Salmonberries (1991) Director, Writer ... a.k.a. Percy Adlon's Salmonberries (Germany: poster title) (Grand Prix des Ameriques, Montreal. Bavarian Film Awards for director P.A. and for Rosel Zech, Best Actress.)
 Younger and Younger (1993) Director, Writer, Producer. (Special Prize of the Jury, Brussels. Best Actress IFF Tokyo Lolita Davidovich)
 In der glanzvollen Welt des Hotel Adlon (1996, TV film) Director ... a.k.a. The Glamorous World of the Adlon Hotel (Bavarian Television Award)
 Eat Your Heart Out (1997) Producer
 Die Straußkiste (1999) Director, Writer Cinematographer ... a.k.a. Forever Flirt (International: English title)
 Hawaiian Gardens (2001) Director, Writer
 Koenig's Sphere (2001) Director ... a.k.a. Koenigs Kugel (German title)
  Bagdad Cafe - The Musical (2003–2006) Director
  Orbela's People (2007)
  Mahler auf der Couch (2010)

Other work
 Elisir D'Amore (2003) opera by Gaetano Donizetti, directed by Percy Adlon for the Berlin State Opera Unter den Linden.
 Wolkenstein (2004) A new opera by Wilfried Hiller and Felix Mitterer, directed by Percy Adlon. Premiere at the State Opera Nürnberg.

Further reading

See also
 Lorenz Adlon (1849–1921), German hotelier, grandfather of Percy
 Hotel Adlon, Berlin, Germany – built by Lorenz Adlon
 Louis Adlon (1908–1947), German-American film actor in Hollywood, grandson of Lorenz, cousin of Percy
 Pamela Adlon (born 1966), American actress, daughter-in-law of Percy
 Hotel Adlon, German film, from book by Louis's father's second wife

References

External links
 
 Bagdad Café, Sundancechannel.com

Living people
1935 births
Percy
Officers Crosses of the Order of Merit of the Federal Republic of Germany
People from Starnberg (district)
Television people from Munich